A cholera vaccine is a vaccine that is effective at preventing cholera. For the first six months after vaccination it provides about 85percent protection, which decreases to 50percent or 62percent during the first year. After two years the level of protection decreases to less than 50percent. When enough of the population is immunized, it may protect those who have not been immunized (known as herd immunity).

The World Health Organization (WHO) recommends the use of cholera vaccines in combination with other measures among those at high risk. With the oral vaccine, two or three doses are typically recommended. The duration of protection is two years in adults and six months in children aged 2–5 years. A single dose vaccine is available for those traveling to an area where cholera is common. In 2010, in some countries an injectable cholera vaccine was available.

The available types of oral vaccine are generally safe. Mild abdominal pain or diarrhea may occur. They are safe in pregnancy and in those with poor immune function. They are licensed for use in more than 60 countries. In countries where the disease is common, the vaccine appears to be cost effective.

The first cholera vaccines were developed in the late 1900s. They were the first widely used vaccine that was made in a laboratory. Oral cholera vaccines were first introduced in the 1990s. It is on the World Health Organization's List of Essential Medicines.

Medical use
In the late twentieth century, oral cholera vaccines started to be used on a massive scale, with millions of vaccinations taking place, as a tool to control cholera outbreaks in addition to the traditional interventions of improving safe water supplies, sanitation, handwashing, and other means of improving hygiene. The Dukoral monovalent vaccine from Sweden, which combines formalin, heat-killed whole cells of Vibrio cholerae O1, and a recombinant cholera toxin B subunit, was licensed in 1991, mainly for travellers. Out of a million doses sold during the following decade, 63 negative side effects were reported. The Shanchol/mORCVAX bivalent vaccine, which combines the O1 and O139 serogroups, was originally licensed in Vietnam in 1997 and given in 20 million doses to children in Vietnam during the following decade. , Vietnam continued to incorporate oral cholera vaccination in its public health programme, administering the vaccination through targeted mass vaccination of school-aged children in cholera endemic regions.

The cholera vaccine is widely used by backpackers and persons visiting locations where there is a high risk of cholera infection. However, since it does not provide 100percent immunity from the disease, food hygiene precautions are also recommended when visiting an area where there is a high risk of becoming infected with cholera. Although the protection observed has been described as "moderate", herd immunity can multiply the effectiveness of vaccination. Dukoral has been licensed for children two years of age and older, Shanchol for children one year of age and older. The administration of the vaccine to adults confers additional indirect protection (herd immunity) to children.

The World Health Organization (WHO) recommends both preventive and reactive use of the vaccine, making the following key statements:

The WHO as of late 2013 established a revolving stockpile of two million OCV doses. The supply is increasing to six million as a South Korean companies has gone into production (2016), the old production not being able to handle WHO demand in Haiti and Sudan for 2015, nor prior years. GAVI Alliance donated $115 million to help pay for expansions.

Oral

The oral vaccines are generally of two forms: inactivated and attenuated.

Inactivated oral vaccines provide protection in 52percent of cases the first year following vaccination and in 62percent of cases the second year. Two variants of the inactivated oral vaccine currently are in use: WC-rBS and BivWC. WC-rBS (marketed as "Dukoral") is a monovalent inactivated vaccine containing killed whole cells of V. cholerae O1 plus additional recombinant cholera toxin B subunit. BivWC (marketed as "Shanchol" and "mORCVAX") is a bivalent inactivated vaccine containing killed whole cells of V. cholerae O1 and V. cholerae O139. mORCVAX is only available in Vietnam.

Bacterial strains of both Inaba and Ogawa serotypes and of El Tor and Classical biotypes are included in the vaccine. Dukoral is taken orally with bicarbonate buffer, which protects the antigens from the gastric acid. The vaccine acts by inducing antibodies against both the bacterial components and CTB. The antibacterial intestinal antibodies prevent the bacteria from attaching to the intestinal wall, thereby impeding colonisation of V. cholerae O1. The anti-toxin intestinal antibodies prevent the cholera toxin from binding to the intestinal mucosal surface, thereby preventing the toxin-mediated diarrhoeal symptoms.

A live, attenuated oral vaccine (CVD 103-HgR or Vaxchora), derived from a serogroup O1 classical Inaba strain, was approved by the US FDA in 2016.

Injectable
Although rarely in use, the injected cholera vaccines are effective for people living where cholera is common. They offer some degree of protection for up to two years after a single shot, and for three to four years with annual booster. They reduce the risk of death from cholera by 50percent in the first year after vaccination.

Side effects
Both of the available types of oral vaccine are generally safe. Mild abdominal pain or diarrhea may occur. They are safe in pregnancy and in those with poor immune function. They are licensed for use in more than 60 countries. In countries where the disease is common, the vaccine appears to be cost effective.

History of development

The first cholera vaccines were developed in the late 19th century. There were several pioneers in the development of the vaccine:
 The first known attempt at a cholera vaccine was made by Louis Pasteur and it was aimed at preventing cholera in chickens. This was the first widely used vaccine that was made in a laboratory. Unfortunately, later use showed this early cholera vaccine to be ineffective.
 In 1884, Spanish physician Jaume Ferran i Clua developed a live vaccine he had isolated from cholera patients in Marseilles, and used it that on over 30,000 individuals in Valencia during that year's epidemic. However, his vaccine and inoculation was rather controversial and was rejected by his peers and several investigation commissions.
 In 1892, Waldemar Haffkine developed an effective vaccine with less severe side effects, later testing it on more than 40,000 people in the Calcutta area from 1893 to 1896. His vaccine was accepted by the medical community, and is credited as the first effective human cholera vaccine.
 Finally, in 1896, Wilhelm Kolle introduced a heat-killed vaccine that was significantly easier to prepare than Haffkine's, using it on a large scale in Japan in 1902.

Oral cholera vaccines were first introduced in the 1990s.

Society and culture

Legal status
In 2016, the U.S. Food and Drug Administration (FDA) approved Vaxchora, a single-dose oral vaccine to prevent cholera for travelers. , Vaxchora was the only FDA-approved vaccine for the prevention of cholera.

Economics

References

Further reading

External links
 
 

Inactivated vaccines
Vaccines
World Health Organization essential medicines (vaccines)
Wikipedia medicine articles ready to translate